Agyneta ressli is a species of sheet weaver found in Austria, Germany, Greece and Switzerland. It was described by Wunderlich in 1973.

References

ressli
Spiders of Europe
Spiders described in 1973